The 1st Guards Infantry Division (German: 1. Garde-Infanterie-Division) was a unit of the Prussian (and later) Imperial German Army and was stationed in Berlin.

Lineage
The division was created on September 5, 1818 when the guards brigades, which had been created in 1813 and were assigned to various commands, were grouped into a single formation. Ernst Ludwig von Tippelskirch was appointed as the first commander of the division.

Austro-Prussian War 
The division was active during the Austro-Prussian War. It was commanded by Generalmajor Constantin von Alvensleben and part of the Second Army.

Franco-Prussian War 
During the Franco-Prussian War, the division was commanded by Generalmajor Alexander August Wilhelm von Pape. It was part of the Second Army, commanded by Prince Friedrich Karl of Prussia. Throughout the war 4 officers, 70 men, and 10 horses were killed.

Order of Battle: 1870
 1st Guards Infantry Brigade
1st Foot Guards
3rd Foot Guards
Guards Fusilier Regiment
 2nd Guards Infantry Brigade
2nd Foot Guards
4th Foot Guards

Divisional Troops
Guards Jäger Battalion
Guards Hussars
1st Foot Battalion, Guards Artillery

Imperial German Army 
By 1914 the division was subordinate to the Guards Corps of the Imperial German Army. At the outbreak of the First World War it was commanded by Gen-Lt. Oskar von Hutier.

 Order of Battle: 1914
 1st Guards Infantry Brigade
1st Foot Guards
3rd Foot Guards
 2nd Guards Infantry Brigade
2nd Foot Guards
4th Foot Guards
 1st Guards Field Artillery Brigade
1st Guards Field Artillery
2nd Guards Field Artillery
 Guards Hussar Regiment (2nd, 3rd, and 5th Squadrons)
 1st Company, Guards Pioneer Battalion
 1st and 3rd Section, Guards Field Ambulance Company
 1st Guards Divisional Pontoon Train

References

External links
 Prussian Army Units, by Michael Hughes

Infantry divisions of Germany in World War I
Military units and formations established in 1818
Military units and formations disestablished in 1919